Celia, Viscountess Whitelaw (1 January 1917 – 5 December 2011) was the wife of William "Willie" Whitelaw, MP, former Home Secretary, Deputy Prime Minister and aide to Margaret Thatcher.

Born as Cecilia Doriel Sprot (she later changed her name to Celia) at her family home, Riddell Estate near Melrose, to Major Mark Sprot of the Scots Guards and his wife, Meliora (née Hay), she attended school at the now defunct Oxenfoord Castle boarding school in Midlothian. During World War II, she volunteered to serve with the Women's Auxiliary Territorial Service (ATS) and was posted to Edinburgh Castle as a clerk with the Scottish Command. She was referenced in the book, Debs at War 1939-1945: How Wartime Changed Their Lives, written by Anne de Courcy.

Marriage
She was engaged in 1942 and married Whitelaw in St Giles' Cathedral, Edinburgh, on 6 February 1943. They had four daughters. After he returned to civilian life following World War II, she played an active role in helping him run his family estates in Dunbartonshire and Lanarkshire. When he decided to go into politics in the 1950s, she became first a vivacious campaigner and later an active parliamentary wife. When her husband was created Viscount Whitelaw in 1983, she became Viscountess Whitelaw, however the lack of a male heir ended the viscountcy with Whitelaw's death. Lady Whitelaw served on the Lakeland Horticultural Society and was vice-president of the Penrith and District Gardeners' and Allotment Holders' Association. After her husband suffered a series of strokes from 1987, she cared for him until his death in 1999.

Charity work
Lady Whitelaw was heavily involved in charity work and philanthropy, including Barnardo's, British Red Cross, the Blencowe Women's Institute, Wives of Westminster, the Eden Valley hospice (in Carlisle), and the Yellow Brick Road Appeal of the Children's Foundation.

Death
Viscountess Whitelaw died in Edinburgh on 5 December 2011, aged 94.

She was survived by her four daughters (Elizabeth, Countess of Swinton; Carolyn Graves-Johnston; Mary Coltman; and Pamela Graham), twelve grandchildren, and a brother, Aidan. She was buried with her husband at St Andrew's Church, Dacre.

References

1917 births
2011 deaths
Auxiliary Territorial Service soldiers
British viscountesses
British horticulturists
People from the Scottish Borders
20th-century British philanthropists
Wives of knights